Chicago 10: Speak Your Peace is a 2007 American animated documentary written and directed by Brett Morgen that tells the story of the Chicago Eight. The Chicago Eight were charged by the United States federal government with conspiracy, crossing state lines with intent to incite a riot, and other charges related to anti-Vietnam War and countercultural protests in Chicago, Illinois during the 1968 Democratic National Convention.

The film features the voices of Hank Azaria, Dylan Baker, Nick Nolte, Mark Ruffalo, Roy Scheider, Liev Schreiber, James Urbaniak, and Jeffrey Wright in an animated reenactment of the trial based on transcripts and rediscovered audio recordings. It also contains archival footage of Abbie Hoffman, David Dellinger, William Kunstler, Jerry Rubin, Bobby Seale, Tom Hayden, and Leonard Weinglass, and of the protest and riot itself.

Plot
At the 1968 Democratic Convention, protesters, denied permits for public demonstrations, repeatedly clashed with the Chicago Police Department, and these clashes were witnessed live by a television audience of over 50 million. The events had a polarizing effect on the country.

Needing to find a scapegoat for the disturbances, the Nixon Administration charged eight of the most vocal activists with conspiracy, inciting to riot, and other charges and brought them to trial a year later. The defendants represented a broad cross-section of the anti-war movement, from counter-culture icons Abbie Hoffman and Jerry Rubin, to renowned pacifist David Dellinger.

Seven of the defendants were represented by Leonard Weinglass and famed liberal attorney William Kunstler, who went head-to-head with prosecution attorney Tom Foran. The eighth defendant, Bobby Seale, co-chair of the Black Panther Party, insisted on defending himself and was bound, gagged and handcuffed to his chair by Judge Julius Hoffman.

Cast
 Hank Azaria as Abbie Hoffman and Allen Ginsberg
 Dylan Baker as David Dellinger and David Stahl
 Nick Nolte as Tom Foran
 Mark Ruffalo as Jerry Rubin
 Roy Scheider as Judge Julius Hoffman
 Liev Schreiber as William Kunstler
 James Urbaniak as Rennie Davis and Richard Schultz
 Reg Rogers as Tom Hayden
 Jeffrey Wright as Bobby Seale
 Ebon Moss-Bachrach as Paul Krassner
 Debra Eisenstadt as Mary Ellen Dahl and Waitress
 Lloyd Floyd as Robert Pierson / Arthur Aznavoorian / Police officer
 Leonard Weinglass as himself
 Catherine Curtin as Barbara Callender
 Chuck Montgomery as Lee Weiner
 Dave Boat as Norman Mailer, Marshal #1
 Roger L. Jackson as Marshal #2, Reporter #4, Reporter #6
 Amy Ryan as Anita Hoffman

Production
The title of the film is drawn from a quote by Jerry Rubin, who said, "Anyone who calls us the Chicago Seven is a racist. Because you're discrediting Bobby Seale. You can call us the Chicago Eight, but really we're the Chicago Ten, because our two lawyers went down with us." The animated courtroom sequences were also informed by Rubin's description of the trial as a "cartoon show."

Morgen tells IONCINEMA, "We took events that happened forty years ago and ultimately wrote a film about today. I wasn’t born then so I couldn’t do it any other way," and "That’s why when Allen Ginsberg goes to the witness stand and says: ‘Politics is theater and magic, is the manipulation by the media of imagery that hypnotizes the country into believing in a war that didn’t exist’, he’s not speaking about the Vietnam war, he's referring to Colin Powell testimony in front of United Nations. That was my interpretation of it." Traditional music was not used in the film because according to Morgen, it "became a cliché, something anachronistic." Morgen explained to Chicago Magazine that the inclusion of music by artists such as Black Sabbath, Rage Against the Machine, the Beastie Boys, and Eminem is because "I don’t think of this as a movie about 1968 at all. I think this is a movie about 2007 and 2008."

Release
The film premiered January 18, 2007 at the 2007 Sundance Film Festival. It later premiered at Silverdocs, the AFI/Discovery Channel Documentary Festival in Downtown Silver Spring, Maryland. The film opened in limited release in the United States on February 29, 2008.  It was aired nationally on the PBS program Independent Lens on October 29, 2008.

Critical reception
Chicago 10 received generally favorable reviews from critics. , the film holds an 81% approval rating on the review aggregator Rotten Tomatoes, based on 84 reviews with an average rating of 6.74/10. The website's critics consensus reads: "Brett Morgan's half-animated, half-documentary film is an arresting, sometimes visionary portrait of the historic and chaotic trial." Metacritic reported the film had a weighted average score of 69 out of 100, based on 24 reviews.

Jim Emerson of RogerEbert.com gave the film 3.5 out of 4 stars, and writes, "Through the kaleidoscopic prism of Brett Morgen's uproarious "Chicago 10," a zippy mixture of documentary footage and motion-capture animation, we see how the confrontations between police and protesters at the 1968 Democratic National Convention played out as political theater," and how "[d]uring the trial, the defendants turned Judge Julius Hoffman's kangaroo courtroom into the stage for a wild farce, complete with kisses, costumes and paper airplanes." Emerson observes, "Through the prism of this movie we can see how [Abbie] Hoffman's satirical brand of "political theater," a concept he did not invent but adeptly exploited, may have seemed both cynical and naive at the time, but was keenly perceptive, even prescient."

Accolades
The film was the winner of the Silver Hugo for Best Documentary at the Chicago International Film Festival in 2007. The film was nominated in 2009 for Best Documentary Screenplay from the Writers Guild of America and nominated for a News & Documentary Emmy Award in 2009 for Outstanding Individual Achievement in a Craft: Graphic Design and Art Direction.

See also
 Conspiracy: The Trial of the Chicago 8 
 Steal This Movie! 
 William Kunstler: Disturbing the Universe 
 The Chicago 8 
 The Trial of the Chicago 7

References

External links
 
 
 
 
 Chicago 10 site for Independent Lens on PBS 
 Chicago 10 at Sundance.org
 Chicago 10 at Beyond Chron
 NPR's Fresh Air interviews Brett Morgen
  "The 34 best political movies ever made", Ann Hornaday, The Washington Post (Jan. 23, 2020), ranked No. 33

2007 films
2007 animated films
2007 documentary films
American animated documentary films
American independent films
Participant (company) films
2000s American animated films
Films directed by Brett Morgen
Films scored by Jeff Danna
Roadside Attractions films
Films about activists
Films about the Chicago Seven
Curious Pictures films
Films produced by Graydon Carter
Cultural depictions of Abbie Hoffman
2000s English-language films
English-language documentary films